Rimgaila (first name and surname), Rimgailas (masculine first name) Rimgailė (feminine first name)  is a  dual-stemmed pagan Lithuanian name constructed from rim- (rimti - "be calm") + gail- (*gailas - "strong"), which is quite common in Lithuania at present.

Notable bearers
Rimgailė (14th–15th centuries), Lithuanian noblewoman
 (1805–1870), Lithuanian architect
 (1932–2008), Lithuanian journalist
Rimgaila Salys, Lithuanian-American slavist

References

Lithuanian given names
Lithuanian-language surnames